Charles Alexander Sheldon (17 October 1867 – 21 September 1928) was an American conservationist and the "Father of Denali National Park". He had a special interest in the bighorn sheep and spent time hunting with the Seri Indians in Sonora, Mexico, who knew him as Maricaana Caamla ("American hunter"). Another favorite haunt was the lakes and rivers which later became Kejimkujik National Park in Nova Scotia where Sheldon built a cabin at Beaverskin Lake.

In December 1905, Sheldon was elected member of the Boone and Crockett Club, a wildlife conservation organization founded by Theodore Roosevelt and George Bird Grinnell in 1887. The Sheldon National Wildlife Refuge in northwestern Nevada is named in Sheldon's honor.

Bibliography
The Wilderness of the North Pacific Coast Islands
The Wilderness of the Upper Yukon
The Wilderness of Denali

References

External links
Charles Sheldon: One Man’s Quest to Create the Alaskan Park
Biography
Denali National Park Information Guide

1867 births
1928 deaths
American conservationists
Place of birth missing
Place of death missing